Ravnica is a village in western Slovenia in the Municipality of Nova Gorica. It is located on the high Trnovo Forest Plateau, overlooking the villages of Grgar and Čepovan.

The parish church in the settlement is dedicated to Saints Hermagoras and Fortunatus and belongs to the Diocese of Koper.

References

External links
Ravnica on Geopedia
Search satellite map at Maplandia.com

Populated places in the City Municipality of Nova Gorica